Jiao Xiaoping (born July 1966) is a former Chinese financial expert and politician. He was investigated by China's top anti-graft agency in February 2023. Previously he served as deputy commander of the Xinjiang Production and Construction Corps.

Biography 
Jiao was born in July 1966, at the dawn of the Cultural Revolution. He assumed various administrative and political roles in divisions and departments of the Ministry of Finance of the People's Republic of China before being appointed deputy director of the China Clean Development Mechanism Fund.

In June 2022, he was transferred to the Xinjiang Production and Construction Corps and appointed deputy commander.

Investigation 
On 5 February 2023, he has been placed under investigation for "serious violations of laws and regulations" by the Central Commission for Discipline Inspection (CCDI), the party's internal disciplinary body, and the National Supervisory Commission, the highest anti-corruption agency of China.

References

1966 births
Living people
Chinese politicians
Chinese Communist Party politicians